Penaeus is a genus of prawns, including the giant tiger prawn (P. monodon), the most important species of farmed crustacean worldwide. The genus has been reorganised following a proposition of Pérez Farfante and Kensley based on morphological differences, in particular the genital characteristics of these animals, although this revision has not been universally accepted. Following the revision, many species formerly in the genus Penaeus have been reassigned to new genera in the family Penaeidae: Farfantepenaeus, Fenneropenaeus, Litopenaeus and Marsupenaeus. The following table gives an overview:

A few more species that are sometimes given as Penaeus spp. are actually assigned to the genus Melicertus:

References

External links

List of species  

Crustacean genera
Penaeidae
Taxa named by Johan Christian Fabricius